Paarthal Pasu is a 1988 Indian Tamil-language thriller film, directed by K. S. Gopalakrishnan and produced by G. Chinnadurai and G. Ravikumar. The film stars Ramarajan, Chandrasekhar, Pallavi and Sri Bharathi.

Cast

Ramarajan as Lawyer Shankar
Chandrasekhar
Pallavi
Sri Bharathi
Thaarani
S. S. Chandran
Senthil
Senthamarai
G. Seenivasan
Karnan
Achamillai Gopi
C. S. Pandiyan
Nagaraja Chozhan
Peeli Sivam
T. A. Balaji
Oru Viral Krishna Rao
Major Sundarrajan in Guest Appearance
Poornam Viswanathan in Guest Appearance
Veera Raghavan in Guest Appearance

Soundtrack
The music was composed by Ilaiyaraaja.

Reception
The Indian Express wrote that the film "means to exploit audience's weaknesses to the hilt".

References

External links
 

1988 films
1980s mystery thriller films
Indian mystery thriller films
Films scored by Ilaiyaraaja
1980s Tamil-language films
Films directed by K. S. Gopalakrishnan
Films with screenplays by K. S. Gopalakrishnan